Da znaem poveche (Да Знаeм Повече; meaning To Know More in English) was a Bulgarian popular-science and leisure, bi-monthly magazine, accessible online and through e-readers, tablet devices, and mobile phones in a DRM-free PDF format. It contained a multitude of articles in a plurality of topics, such as nature, technology, science, space, history, travel, art and statistics. The magazine was distributed for free and featured crowd-sourced articles, written and designed by volunteer authors. Its targeted audience was the young media consumption-addicted reader. Every issue contains articles, structured into several topics, including science, space, technology, history, art, nature and travel.

References

2012 establishments in Bulgaria
Bi-monthly magazines
Magazines published in Bulgaria
Bulgarian-language magazines
Magazines established in 2012
Online magazines
Popular science magazines
Science and technology magazines